The Societé anonyme belge d'Exploitation de la Navigation aérienne (French), better known by the acronym Sabena or SABENA, was the national airline of Belgium from 1923 to 2001, with its base at Brussels National Airport. After its bankruptcy in 2001, SN Brussels Airlines was formed through a takeover of former subsidiary Delta Air Transport and took over part of Sabena's assets in February 2002, which became Brussels Airlines after a merger with Virgin Express in March 2007. The airline's corporate headquarters were located in the Sabena House on the grounds of Brussels Airport in Zaventem.

History

1923–1939: Beginnings
Sabena began operations on 23 May 1923 as the national carrier of Belgium. The airline was created by the Belgian government after its predecessor SNETA (Syndicat national pour l'étude des transports aériens, National Syndicate for the Study of Aerial Transports) - formed in 1919 to pioneer commercial aviation in Belgium - ceased operations. Sabena operated its first commercial flight from Haren Brussels to London (UK) on 1 July 1923, via Ostend. Services to Rotterdam (Netherlands) and Strasbourg (France) were launched on 1 April 1924. The Strasbourg service was extended to Basle (Switzerland) on 10 June 1924. Amsterdam (Netherlands) was added on 1 September 1924, and Hamburg (Germany) followed on 1 May 1929 via Antwerp, Düsseldorf, and Essen.

Belgian Congo

When Sabena was created, the airline was partly funded by Belgians in the Belgian Congo colony who had lost their air service, an experimental passenger and cargo company (LARA) between Léopoldville, Lisala, and Stanleyville a year earlier. They expected the new Belgian national airline to fill this gap. On 12 February 1925, Sabena pioneered a long haul across Africa to Leopoldville, capital of the Belgian Congo. Throughout its history, Sabena had a long tradition of service to African destinations and for a long time, these were the only profitable routes served by the airline.

Sabena used land planes for its Congo operations and a program of aerodrome construction was initiated in the Congo. This was finished in 1926 and Sabena immediately began flights within the Belgian colony, the main route being Boma-Léopoldville-Élisabethville, a 2,288 km (1,422 mi) route over dense jungle. First, flights were operated with De Havilland DH.50s, although these were quickly replaced by the larger Handley Page W.8f which had three engines and offered ten seats.

By 1931 Sabena's fleet, including the aircraft used on the Congo network, totalled 43 aircraft. Its mainstay type was the Fokker F.VIIB with a lesser number of smaller Fokker VIIA and 14 Handley-Page types. It also flew British Westland Wessex aircraft.

Sabena occasionally flew to tropical Africa, Belgium's Congo colony, but mostly these aircraft were shipped out. There was no direct flight yet between Belgium and the colony. As the 1930s progressed, Sabena cooperated with Air France and Deutsche Luft Hansa, which also had interests in routes to destinations across Africa.

Sabena's first long-haul flight to the Congo occurred on 12 February 1935 and took five and a half days, for which Sabena used a Fokker F-VII/3m aircraft. The following year, Sabena purchased the Savoia-Marchetti SM.73 airliner. With a speed of 300 km/h (200 mph), it reduced the journey time to only four days, and the Sabena service ran on alternate weeks to an Air Afrique service.

Expansion in Europe
In Europe, Sabena opened services to Copenhagen and Malmö in 1931 and a route to Berlin was initiated in 1932. The mainstay pre-war airliner that Sabena used in Europe was the successful Junkers Ju 52/3m airliner. The airline's pre-war routes covered almost 6,000 km within Europe. While the Brussels Haren Airport was Sabena's main base, the company also operated services from other Belgian airports and had a domestic network that was mainly used by businessmen who wanted to be in their coastal villas for the weekend.

In 1938, the airline purchased the new Savoia-Marchetti SM.83, a development of the S.M. 73 with a speed of 435 km/h (270 mph), although it flew services at a cruising speed of about 400 km/h (250 mph).

1939–1946: Wartime
At the outbreak of World War II in 1939, Sabena's fleet totalled 18 aircraft. Its mainstay fleet type was the Savoia-Marchetti SM.73 airliner (it had 11 of the type) and the Junkers Ju 52/3m airliner (it had five). Sabena also had just taken delivery of two Douglas DC-3s.

During the war, the airline maintained its Belgian Congo routes, but all European services ceased.

1946–1960: Transatlantic expansion

After the war, in 1946 Sabena resumed operating a network of intra-European scheduled services. The fleet initially consisted mainly of Douglas DC-3s. There were thousands of surplus Douglas C-47 Skytrains (the military variant of the DC-3) available to help airlines restart operations after the war. The airline now flew under the name of SABENA - Belgian World Airlines.

Sabena started its first transatlantic route to New York City on 4 June 1946, initially using unpressurised Douglas DC-4 airliners which were augmented and later replaced by Douglas DC-6Bs. The DC-4s also restarted the airline's traditional route to the Belgian Congo. Sabena was the first airline to introduce transatlantic schedules from the north of England, when one of its DC-6Bs inaugurated the Brussels-Manchester-New York route on 28 October 1953.

The Convair 240 was introduced in 1949 to partially replace the DC-3s that until then had flown most European services. As of 1956, improved Convair 440 "Metropolitan" twins began replacing the Convair 240 twins and were used successfully well into the 1960s between European regional destinations.

In 1957, the long-range Douglas DC-7C was introduced for long-haul routes but this plane would begin to be supplanted after only three years by the jet age. It remained in service on the transatlantic route until 1962.

On 3 June 1954, a Soviet Air Force Mikoyan-Gurevich MiG-15 (NATO reporting name "Fagot") attacked a Sabena-operated Douglas DC-3 on a cargo flight from the United Kingdom to Yugoslavia, killing the radio operator and wounding both the captain and engineer. Co-pilot Douglas Wilson managed to land in Austria but the plane suffered significant damage.

For the 1958 world exposition in Brussels, Sabena leased two Lockheed Super Constellations from Seaboard World Airlines, using them mainly on transatlantic routes. In the same period, there were experiments with helicopter passenger service using Sikorsky S-58 aircraft from Brussels to Antwerp, Rotterdam, Eindhoven and the Paris heliport at Issy-les-Moulineaux.

1960–1990: The jet age

1960 saw the introduction of the Boeing 707-320 intercontinental jet for trans-Atlantic flights to New York. SABENA was mainland Europe's first airline to operate a jet across the Atlantic (BOAC had been flying jet transatlantic services using the de Havilland Comet 4 since 4 October 1958). One of Sabena's aircraft became the first Boeing 707 to crash while in commercial service when Flight 548 crashed while preparing to land at Brussels on 15 February 1961. The United States Figure Skating Team was aboard the aircraft, en route from New York to Prague via Brussels to compete in a figure skating championship.

Six Caravelle jetliners were introduced on all medium-haul routes in Europe from February 1961, being flown on most routes alongside the Convair 440s, until the early 1970s.

The beginning of the 1960s saw a major upheaval for Sabena in the Congo. Widespread rioting against Belgian colonials in the months leading up to, and after the independence of the Democratic Republic of the Congo, caused thousands of Belgians to flee the country. The Belgian government commandeered Sabena's entire long haul fleet to get the refugees back to Europe. Independence also meant the end of the impressive regional network of routes that the airline had built up in the Congo since 1924. When the new republic began its own airline, Air Congo, in June 1961, Sabena held 30 percent of that airline's shares.

The Douglas DC-6Bs remained in service with Sabena in the mid-1960s although they were no longer used on the airline's main routes. The Boeing 707s and Caravelles became the mainstay types during this decade. Boeing 727-100s were introduced on important European routes and also some African services from 1967 in a unique colour scheme; the fin markings incorporated bare-metal rudder and white engine colours. The only other aircraft to have its own special markings was the McDonnell Douglas DC-10. At this time Fokker F27 Friendships entered service between regional Belgian airports and European destinations such as London Heathrow.

The Boeing 747-100 was introduced in 1971, on transatlantic routes flying alongside the Boeing 707-320Cs. Sabena, like many other trans-Atlantic airlines, was satisfied with the Boeing 707s. For commercial reasons it was recognised that it had to buy jumbo jets for its prestige services, notably New York JFK and as of the mid-seventies, Chicago O'Hare. Sabena purchased only two first generation jumbo jets, one named Tante Agathe (which means Aunt Agathe in French), and it continued to fly the 707 into the late 1970, as the Boeing 747-100's last flight occurred in 1993.

In 1973, the Boeing 727s on the European network were replaced by Boeing 737-200s. The McDonnell Douglas DC-10-30 entered service in 1974. In total, Sabena purchased five of these convertible (Passengers and/or freight) combi aircraft wide-body jets.

In 1984 Airbus A310s were introduced on routes that had high passenger density. This aircraft type also introduced a modernisation of the 1973 Sabena livery, in which a lighter blue was used and the titles on the fuselage were in a more modern style.

In June 1986 the first of two Boeing 747-300 aircraft joined the fleet, eventually replacing the older 747-100s.

In an advertisement in National Geographic June 1982 (volume 161, no. 6) Sabena prided itself with a superior inflight service. "And unlike most European airlines Sabena still offers First Class service within Europe and all the way through." This advertisement also stated that "Sabena flies to 76 destinations on 4 continents" and used the slogan "belgian world airlines".

In 1989 Sabena invited Belgian fashion designer Olivier Strelli to create a new range of uniforms for its cabin crews.

1990–1995: Sabena World Airlines

A new name, Sabena World Airlines, and colours were introduced for the 1990s. The new livery had an overall white colour and the white circle tail logo in blue on the fin. A large "Sabena" title covered the fuselage in light blue and the name "Belgian World Airlines" was at times just visible, though the title was also painted on the fuselage in small, clear letters. The 1990s saw further fleet type renewal: the DC-10-30s were replaced with twin-engined Airbus A330 and the Boeing 747s with four-engined Airbus A340.

After the liberalisation of the airline industry throughout Europe and the economic consequences of the Gulf War, the Belgian government, the main shareholder of the company, realized that Sabena had little chance of surviving on its own in this very competitive market, and began searching for a suitable partner.

Sabena remained in a poor financial state, and year after year the Belgian government had to cover losses, however it was prevented from providing new funds due to EU State Aid rules. For help in business due to their financial problems, Sabena leased a couple of Boeing 747s from Air France. Many more aircraft were leased for longer periods, but had to keep their distinctive French registration numbers. 

Around 1987, SAS tried to merge with the carrier, but the merger was blocked by the Belgian authorities. In 1989, British Airways and KLM purchased stakes in Sabena, which were later sold back to the Belgian government. In 1993, Air France purchased a large minority stake in Sabena, which it sold soon after. Finally, in 1995, Swissair purchased a 49 percent stake in Sabena and took over management.

In 1993 Sabena adopted its third and final logo, and its head office was in the Air Terminus building on Rue Cardinal Mercier in Brussels.

In 1994, Paul Rusesabagina, a manager for Sabena-owned hotels in the former Belgian territory of Rwanda, sheltered over 1200 Tutsis and moderate Hutus at the Hôtel des Mille Collines of Kigali, saving them from being slaughtered by the Interahamwe militia during the Rwandan genocide (this is depicted in the 2004 motion picture Hotel Rwanda).

1995–2001: Swissair control

When Swissair took over management of the airline, few modifications were made to the aircraft's liveries, including a sticker, saying: Flying together with Swissair. 
In March and April 1998 two McDonnell-Douglas MD-11 aircraft, both leased from CityBird, joined the fleet and such long-haul destinations as Newark, Montreal and São Paulo were (re)introduced. Also, that year saw the delivery of the last passenger version of the MD-11 from Boeing, which merged with McDonnell Douglas a year before.

1999 saw new colours introduced to the fleet, beginning with an Airbus A340. One of the latest fleet types that Sabena introduced, right after the A321 and A320 was the A319 which saw service in 2000. These new planes were part of a record-order of 34 Airbus A320 family aircraft, imposed on Sabena when under Swissair management.

After an airline recession and the effects on the airline industry of the September 11 attacks in 2001, all airlines that flew across the Atlantic suffered. Swissair had pledged to invest millions in Sabena but failed to do so, partly because the airline had financial problems itself, having filed for bankruptcy protection one month prior. Sabena filed for legal protection against its creditors on 3 October, and went into liquidation on 6 November 2001. Fred Chaffart, chairman of the board of directors of Sabena, read a declaration on this day to explain the decision.

7 November 2001 was the final day of operations for Sabena.  (operated by an Airbus A340-311 registered as OO-SCZ) from Abidjan, Ivory Coast and Cotonou, Benin, was the last Sabena flight to land in Brussels. The flight had  266 passengers and eleven crew members.

A group of investors managed to take over Delta Air Transport, one of Sabena's subsidiaries, and transformed it into SN Brussels Airlines. That airline merged with Virgin Express in 2006 to form a new company, Brussels Airlines.

2001: Bankruptcy

The Belgian Parliament formed a committee to investigate the reasons behind the bankruptcy of Sabena and the involvement of Switzerland's flag carrier. At the same time, the company's administrator investigated possible legal steps against Swissair, and its successors in interest Swiss International Air Lines and Lufthansa.

In 2006, the Belgian government, a former major shareholder, filed criminal charges against the former Swissair management. The former Swissair management was condemned by the judges.

On 16 January 2007 the Belgian - Flemish news program Terzake reported that during the 1990s, several members of the board were paid large sums illegally through a Sabena affiliate in Bermuda. When Paul Reutlinger became the CEO of the company, he stopped the illegal payments. Terzake went on to state that this might explain why the Belgian board members remained quiet when it became apparent Swissair was exploiting Sabena and eventually drove the company into bankruptcy.

One of the direct causes was Swissair not living up to their contractual obligations and failing to inject necessary funds into the company. This was because at the time Swissair was having its own financial problems. In the so-called "Hotel Agreement", signed on July 17, 2001, Belgian prime minister Guy Verhofstadt met with Swissair boss Mario Corti, who agreed to inject €258 million into Sabena, but the sum was never paid. The purchase of 34 new Airbus A320 family planes, imposed under Swissair's management, was a burden with which Sabena could not cope.

After the bankruptcy, a parliamentary commission in Belgium was established to investigate the demise of the airline. The Belgian politicians got a part of the blame; Rik Daems, who, at the time, was Minister of Public Enterprises and Participations, Telecommunication and Middle Classes, received the most criticism due to his lack of effort. Swissair itself went bankrupt in October 2001 and was liquidated in March 2002.

Georges Jaspis
At the outbreak of World War II, Georges Jaspis (b. 11 November 1916) was a pilot in the Belgian Military Aviation. In 1942 he escaped to England where he flew for No. 609 Squadron RAF, during which time he was awarded the Distinguished Flying Cross. After the war he joined Sabena and flew with the airline for 33 years, amassing more than 27,000 hours flying time before he retired. Captain Jaspis inaugurated Sabena's Manchester to New York service in October 1953, and took delivery of the Sabena's first Boeing 707 and 747 aircraft. He died 14 December 2007, and was buried in Opprebais, a village south-east of Brussels. The Belgian military attended and a flypast of four F-16 jets in missing man formation was made.

Destinations

The flight schedule of Sabena published in March 2001 comprised 33 cities in Europe, 17 in Africa, 6 in North America, and 4 in Asia. In addition to its air destinations, Sabena also had a ground shuttle service between Valenciennes, France, and Brussels Airport.

Fleet
Sabena's fleet consisted of the following aircraft at the time of the bankruptcy in November 2001:

Historical aircraft
Over the years, Sabena has operated a variety of the following aircraft:

Accidents and incidents
 On 7 December 1934 at least two SABENA aircraft were destroyed in a hangar fire at Haren Airport as a result of a crash of a military Fairey Fox biplane.

Flights to or from Europe
On 11 September 1930, a SABCA F7b/3m (OO-AIN) lost control and crashed shortly after takeoff from Croydon Airport following an unexplained in-flight fire, killing both pilots.
On 10 December 1935, a Savoia-Marchetti S.73 (registered OO-AGN) crashed at Tatsfield, Surrey, United Kingdom, with the loss of 11 lives.
On 4 January 1937, Max Wenner disappeared from a Savoia Marchetti S.73 (registration OO-AGP) over Belgium; the plane itself was dismantled and hauled away by the Germans shortly after invasion of Belgium in 1940.
On 16 November 1937, a Junkers Ju 52/3m (registered OO-AUB) crashed near Ostend, Belgium, while landing, killing all 12 people on board.
On 10 October 1938, a Savoia-Marchetti S.73 (OO-AGT) broke up in mid-air over Soest, Germany en route to Berlin from Düsseldorf, killing all 20 on board.
 On 14 March 1939, a Junkers Ju 52/3mge (OO-AUA) crashed in a field at Sint-Stevens-Woulve due to pilot error, killing the three crew. The aircraft was operating a cargo (mail) from London to Brussels.
On 17 September 1946 at 01:47 local time, a Douglas DC-3 (registered OO-AUR) crashed upon takeoff from Haren Airport, killing one crew member. The other two crew and four passengers on board the flight bound for Croydon Airport survived. The aircraft had lost airspeed on takeoff for unknown reasons.

The next day, 18 September 1946, 27 people died when a SABENA Douglas DC-4 (OO-CBG) crashed 35 km short of Gander Airport, where the aircraft planned to land for a refueling stop on the flight from Brussels to New York. At the time of the accident (07:42 UTC), there was dense fog near the airport, and the pilot executed a flawed approach at too low an altitude. There were 17 survivors (16 passengers and one crew).
The 19 passengers and three crew members on a flight from Brussels to London died on 2 March 1948 when a Douglas DC-3 registered OO-AWH, crashed at 21:14 local time on approach to London Heathrow Airport in low visibility conditions.
On 18 December 1949, at approximately 20:30 local time, a DC-3 (registered OO-AUQ) crashed near Aulnay-sous-Bois, France, killing the four passengers and four crew on board. The aircraft had just left Le Bourget Airport for a flight to Brussels, when a wing separated.
On 14 October 1953 at ca. 15:20 local time, a Convair CV-240 (registered OO-AWQ) crashed near Kelsterbach, West Germany, killing the 40 passengers and four crew aboard the flight from Frankfurt to Brussels. Engine power was lost upon takeoff from Frankfurt Airport, making the aircraft impossible to control. The accident remains the deadliest involving the Convair 240.
One passenger on board a flight from Brussels to Zurich was killed on 19 December of the same year, when the aircraft (a CV-240 registered OO-AWO) hit the ground 2.5 km short of the runway threshold of Kloten Airport at 18:55 local time. In low visibility conditions, the pilot descended below the glidepath. The other 39 passengers and three crew members survived the accident.
The aircraft, on a cargo flight from Blackbushe Airport to Belgrade, remained airborne, and a forced landing at Graz Airport was carried out, during which it ran off the runway. In the incident, one out of the four people on board was killed.
On 13 February 1955, the pilots of Flight 503 from Brussels to Rome lost orientation when approaching Ciampino Airport, resulting in the Douglas DC-6 registered OO-SDB crashing into the slope of Monte Terminillo at 18:53 local time, killing the 21 passengers and eight crew on board.
The crash of Flight 548 with its 73 casualties marked the worst accident in the history of SABENA. It happened on 15 February 1961 at 09:05 UTC, when the aircraft, a Boeing 707 registered OO-SJB, crashed at Brussels Airport following a flight from New York City. Among the dead were the entire American delegation to the 1961 World Figure Skating Championships slated to be held in Prague; the competition was canceled in the aftermath.
On 13 July 1968, a cargo-configured 707 (registered OO-SJK) crashed upon approach to Lagos Airport in Nigeria on a flight from Brussels, killing the seven occupants. It was determined that the aircraft descended too low and struck trees.
A DC-3 registered OO-AUX was damaged beyond repair in a ground accident at Amsterdam Airport Schiphol on 9 May 1970. The pilots began to taxi the aircraft even though they had not been cleared to do so, which resulted in the right propeller hitting an obstacle on the ground, and debris destroying the airliner beyond economic repair. The aircraft had been leased from Delta Air Transport.
On 8 May 1972, Flight 571 from Vienna to Tel Aviv with 101 people on board (a Boeing 707 registered OO-SJG) was hijacked by four members of the terrorist organization Black September, in order to secure the release of 315 detainees from Israeli prisons. At Ben-Gurion International Airport, two hijackers were shot and killed by the Israeli Sayeret Matkal special forces. One passenger died later of the wounds she had suffered in the shootout.

On 15 February 1978, a Boeing 707 (registered OO-SJE) undershot the runway at Los Rodeos Airport, causing the nose gear to collapse, following a chartered holiday flight from Brussels with 189 passengers and seven crew on board. After all passengers and crew were evacuated spilled fuel caught fire, destroying the aircraft.
On 4 April of the same year, at 18:07 local time, a Boeing 737-200 (registered OO-SDH) on a crew training flight suffered a bird strike during landing practice at Charleroi Airport. The pilot instructor attempted to get the aircraft airborne again, but failed because of insufficient remaining runway. The aircraft was damaged beyond repair.
On 29 August 1998, Flight 542 from New York to Brussels with 248 passengers and 11 crew members on board, an Airbus A340-200 (registered OO-SCW), suffered a broken right landing gear upon landing at Brussels Airport. The aircraft veered off the runway. There were no notable injuries in the ensuing evacuation, and the aircraft was repaired.
On 13 October 2000, Flight 689 from Brussels to Abidjan was hijacked by a Nigerian national who was due to be deported. The Airbus A330-200 with 146 other passengers and 11 crew members on board was forced to land at Málaga Airport in Spain, where the perpetrator was overpowered by local police forces.
On 4 December 2000, Flight 877 from Brussels to Nairobi, Kenya, via Bujumbura, Burundi, was struck by machine gun fire as it approached Bujumbura, injuring a passenger and crew member. The Airbus A330, carrying 170 passengers and crew, was struck in an attack blamed by the government on Hutu rebels, who denied responsibility. The aircraft landed safely but did not continue the flight.

Flights in the Belgian colonies
On 26 January 1937, a SABCA S.73 (OO-AGR) crashed south of Oran-es Senia Airport, Algeria during a round trip from Belgium to Belgian Congo, killing all 12 on board. During the flight back to Belgium the aircraft was approaching Oran for an en route stop. Witnesses noticed the aircraft flying at  when it went into a sudden nosedive until it crashed. The cause was not determined, but bad weather and engine problems were ruled out. Several recommendations were issued in the wake of the accident: the center of gravity and baggage requirements are checked to ensure proper load distribution, ensure adequate maintenance and inspection personnel are available in the Congo and ports of call, review maximum hours of piloting to avoid fatigue as well as provide use of the autopilot, require seat belts for pilots, ensure all security measures are taken for crossing the Mediterranean, and to install more cockpit instruments.
On 1 January 1943, a Junkers Ju 52 (registered OO-AUG) crashed 80 mi from Bangui in then French Equatorial Africa.
On 25 March 1944, a Junkers Ju 52/3mge (OO-AGU) crashed at Costermansville (now Bukavu), Belgian Congo.
Only some days later, on 3 April, another aircraft of the same type (OO-AUF) crashed nearby at Mongena.
On 14 December 1945, a Lockheed Model 18 Lodestar (registered OO-CAK) caught fire and was subsequently destroyed following a forced landing near Kouandé during a flight that had originated at Lagos, Nigeria.
On 7 January 1947, a Douglas DC-3 (registered OO-CBO) crashed near Costermansville.
On 24 December 1947, a Lockheed Lodestar (OO-CAR) experienced an engine failure shortly after take-off from an airfield near Mitwaba, then French Congo, and subsequently crashed, killing the five occupants on board.
On 12 May 1948, at 11:00 local time, a DC-4 (registered OO-CBE) crashed near Magazini after flying into a tornado at low altitude during a scheduled passenger flight from Léopoldville (now Kinshasa) to Libenge, then Belgian Congo, killing the 24 passengers and seven crew members; only one passenger survived.
Another 13 people (ten passengers, three crew) were killed on 31 August of that year, when their aircraft, a DC-3 registered OO-UBL, crashed near Kimbwe en route to Elizabethville (now Lubumbashi) from Manono.
On 27 August 1949, a Douglas DC-3 (registered OO-CBK) experienced a loss of engine power shortly after take-off from Leopoldville Airport for a flight to Elizabethville (now Lubumbashi), with 17 passengers and three crew on board. The three crew members and two out of the seventeen passengers on board died in the ensuing .
The engine failed due to hydraulic failure; hydraulic fluid squirted on the windshield, temporarily blinding the pilots who then lost control of the aircraft.
The propeller blade broke off following a shaft failure when the number two engine stopped suddenly after the piston lug on the No. 6 cylinder failed due to fatigue.
On 18 May 1958, a Douglas DC-7 (registered OO-SFA) suffered a problem with its leftmost engine, whilst on a flight from Lisbon to Léopoldville with 56 passengers and nine crew members. The pilots prepared for an emergency landing at Casablanca–Anfa Airport, but shortly before touchdown, a go-around was attempted, which resulted in a stall because of the lesser available engine power. The aircraft crashed into buildings and caught fire at 4:25 a.m. local time, from which only four passengers could be saved alive.

See also

Sabena technics

References

Further reading

External links 

Sabena (Archive)
Sabena India (Archive)
Sabena Technics
Sabena Flight Academy
Sabeniens
Official Virtual Airline
Gumbel, Peter. "The Last Days of Sabena." TIME. Sunday October 20, 2002.
 

 
Defunct airlines of Belgium
Economic history of Belgium
Airlines established in 1923
Airlines disestablished in 2001
1923 establishments in Belgium
Zaventem
2001 disestablishments in Belgium